Conus felitae is a species of sea snail, a marine gastropod mollusk in the family Conidae, the cone snails and their allies.

Like all species within the genus Conus, these snails are predatory and venomous. They are capable of "stinging" humans, therefore live ones should be handled carefully or not at all.

Description
The size of the shell varies between 11 mm and 24 mm.

Distribution
This species occurs in the Atlantic Ocean off Sal Island, Cape Verde.

References

 Rolán E. (1990) Descripcion de nuevas especies y subespecies del genero Conus (Mollusca, Neogastropoda) para el archipielago de Cabo Verde. Iberus Supplement 2: 5–70, 9 pls
  Puillandre N., Duda T.F., Meyer C., Olivera B.M. & Bouchet P. (2015). One, four or 100 genera? A new classification of the cone snails. Journal of Molluscan Studies. 81: 1–23

External links
 The Conus Biodiversity website
 Cone Shells – Knights of the Sea
 

felitae
Gastropods of Cape Verde
Fauna of Sal, Cape Verde
Endemic fauna of Cape Verde
Gastropods described in 1990